Aliko Dangote   (born 10 April 1957) is a Nigerian business magnate who is the founder, chairman, and CEO of the Dangote Group, the largest industrial conglomerate in West Africa. According to Bloomberg Billionaires Index, Dangote's net worth is estimated at US$18.7 billion as of January 2023, making him the richest person in Africa and richest black person in the world.

Early life 
Dangote was born in Kano, Kano State into a wealthy Hausa Muslim family. Dangote's mother, Mariya Sanusi Dantata, was the daughter of businessman Sanusi Dantata. Aliko Dangote's father, Mohammed Dangote, was a business associate of Sanusi Dantata. Through his mother, Dangote is the great-grandson of Alhassan Dantata, the richest West African at the time of his death in 1955.

Dangote was educated at the Sheikh Ali Kumasi Madrasa, followed by Capital High School, Kano. In 1978, he graduated from the Government College, Birnin Kudu. He received a bachelor's degree in business studies and administration from Al-Azhar University, Cairo.

Business career 
The Dangote Group was established as a small trading firm in 1977, the same year Dangote relocated to Lagos to expand the company. Dangote received a ₦500,000 loan from his uncle to begin trading in commodities including bagged cement as well as agricultural goods like rice and sugar. In the 1990s, he approached the Central Bank of Nigeria with the idea that it would be cheaper for the bank to allow his transport company to manage their fleet of staff buses, a proposal that was also approved.

Today, the Dangote Group is one of the largest conglomerates in Africa, with international operations in Benin, Ghana, Zambia and Togo. The Dangote Group has moved from being a trading company to be the largest industrial group in Nigeria, encompassing divisions like Dangote Sugar Refinery, Dangote Cement, and Dangote Flour. Dangote Group dominates the sugar market in Nigeria, with its refinery business is the main supplier (70 percent of the market) to the country's soft drink companies, breweries and confectioners. The company employs more than 11,000 people in West Africa.

In July 2012, Dangote approached the Nigerian Ports Authority to lease an abandoned piece of land at the Apapa Port, which was approved. He later built facilities for his sugar company there. It is the largest refinery in Africa and the third largest in the world, producing 800,000 tonnes of sugar annually. The Dangote Group owns salt factories and flour mills and is a major importer of rice, fish, pasta, cement, and fertiliser. The company exports cotton, cashew nuts, cocoa, sesame seeds, and ginger to several countries. Additionally, it has major investments in real estate, banking, transport, textiles, oil, and gas.

In February 2022, Dangote announced the completion of Peugeot assembling facility in Nigeria following his partnership with Stellantis Group, the parent company of Peugeot, the Kano and Kaduna state government. The new automobile company, Dangote Peugeot Automobiles Nigeria Limited (DPAN) factory which is based in Kaduna commenced operations with the roll-out of Peugeot 301, Peugeot 5008, 3008, 508 and Land Trek."

Wealth 

Dangote became Nigeria's first billionaire in 2007. Dangote reportedly added $9.2 billion to his personal wealth in 2013, according to the Bloomberg Billionaires Index, making him the thirtieth-richest person in the world at the time, and the richest person in Africa. In 2015, the HSBC leaks revealed that Dangote was a HSBC client and that he had assets in a tax haven in the British Virgin Islands.  
As of June 2022, Dangote is the wealthiest person in Africa, with an estimated net worth of US$20 billion.

Political activity 
Dangote had a prominent role in the financing of President Olusegun Obasanjo's re-election bid in 2003, to which he gave over N200 million (US$2 million). He contributed N50 million (US$500 thousand) to the National Mosque under the aegis of "Friends of Obasanjo and Atiku". Dangote also contributed N200 million to the Presidential Library. These highly controversial gifts to members of the ruling PDP party have generated significant concerns despite highly publicized anti-corruption drives during Obasanjo's second term.

In 2011, Dangote was appointed by President Goodluck Jonathan to serve as a member of his economic management team. In 2017, rumors circulated that Dangote was considering a run for President of Nigeria in the 2019 election. Dangote declined to run and asserted that he does not intend to run for elected office. Instead, Dangote went on to serve on a special advisory committee for Muhammadu Buhari's reelection campaign.

Other activities

Philanthropy 
In 2014, the Nigerian government said Dangote had donated 150 million naira (US$750,000) to halt the spread of Ebola. In 2016, Dangote pledged $10 million to support Nigerians affected by the Boko Haram insurgency. In March 2020, he donated 200 million naira (US$500,000) towards the fight against the spread of COVID-19 in Nigeria.

Dangote has worked alongside the Bill & Melinda Gates Foundation on public health issues.

Football 
Aliko Dangote, as well as Femi Otedola, promised to give the Super Eagles of Nigeria US$75,000 for every goal scored in the Africans Cup of Nations (AFCON) 2019. He is also an avid enthusiast of Arsenal F.C. in England and has shown interest in buying it. He also donated money to the Nigeria sport ministry to renovate the national stadium, Abuja.

Personal life 
Dangote lives in Lagos, Nigeria. He has been married and divorced twice. He has three daughters – Mariya, Halima, Fatimah. Aliko's brother, Sani Dangote, died on 14 November 2021 from colon cancer.

Dangote is known for his simple and austere lifestyle; he reportedly works 12 hours a day beginning at 5am and goes to the gym six times a week.

Awards and memberships

Awards and recognition 

 Dangote was awarded Nigeria's second-highest honour, the Grand Commander of the Order of the Niger (GCON) by the former president, Goodluck Jonathan.
 Dangote was named as the Forbes Africa Person of the Year 2014.
For six consecutive years, 2013, 2014, 2015, 2016, 2017, and 2018 Forbes listed him as the "Most Powerful Man in Africa".
In 2014, he was listed CNBC's "Top 25 Businessmen in the World" who changed and shaped the century.
In April 2014, Time magazine listed him among its 100 most influential people in the world.
In October 2015, Dangote was listed among "50 Most Influential Individuals in the World" by Bloomberg Markets.
He won "The Guardian Man of the Year 2015".
He won the "2016 African Business Leader Award", organized by the Africa-America Institute (AAI).
Dangote was cited as one of the top 100 most influential Africans by New African magazine in 2015, 2017, 2018 and 2019.

Memberships 
Dangote sits on the board of the Corporate Council on Africa, and is a member of the steering committee of the United Nations Secretary-General's Global Education First Initiative, the Clinton Global Initiative and the International Business Council of the World Economic Forum. He was named co-chair of the US-Africa Business Center, in September 2016, by the US Chamber of Commerce. In April 2017, he joined the board of directors of the Clinton Health Access Initiative. He is also on the board of One Campaign. Dangote was appointed the founding Chairman of the Nigeria End Malaria Council by President Buhari in August 2022. He is also a member of the Global End Malaria Council, along with other leaders including Bill Gates, Ray Chambers, and former President Ellen Johnson Sirleaf.

See also 
Dantata family
List of Nigerians
List of Hausa people
List of Black billionaires
List of Africans by net worth

References

Further reading 
 Barau, A. S. (2007), The Great Attractions of Kano. Research and Documentation Directorate, Government House, Kano
 Fayemiwo, M. A., & M. M. Neal (2013), Aliko Mohammad Dangote The Biography of the Richest Black Person in the World, Strategic Book Publishing 
 Ekekwe, N. (2020), The Dangote System: Techniques for Building Conglomerates, Tekedia Institute

External links 
  James Whittington, "Nigerian wealth fails to trickle down", BBC News, 19 April 2007

People from Kano State
Living people
1957 births
Nigerian billionaires
Al-Azhar University alumni
Grand Commanders of the Order of the Niger
Businesspeople in the sugar industry
Businesspeople in cement
20th-century Nigerian businesspeople
21st-century Nigerian businesspeople
Nigerian Muslims
Nigerian philanthropists
Nigerian food company founders
Nigerian investors
Dantata family
Businesspeople from Kano
Nigerian manufacturing businesspeople
Nigerian chairpersons of corporations
Nigerian expatriates in Egypt